Yohan Hadikusumo Wiratama (born 6 April 1977) is a badminton player from Indonesia. He is a younger brother of Olympic gold medalist from Indonesia, Alan Budikusuma. He moved to Hong Kong due to tight competition in Indonesia. In Hong Kong, he partnered with another Indonesian who moved to Hong Kong, Albertus Susanto Njoto, in men's doubles.

Career 
Wiratama came from the Djarum Kudus badminton club, and in 2002, he started to represent Hong Kong. He competed at the 2006 and 2010 Asian Games. He was the mixed doubles bronze medallist at the 2009 East Asian Games.

In Men's Single Yohan Hadikusumo won gold medal in Indonesian games in 2000, also defeated 2 olympics gold medalist, 1st defeated Ji Xinpeng from China at Singapore Open 2011, 2nd  defeated Taufik Hidayat from Indonesia at Hongkong open 2003, 

In Men's Doubles Yohan paired Albertus Susanto Njoto defeated another Olympic gold medalist in men's doubles Cai Yun and Fu Hai Feng from China at All England 2008. 

Wiratama played at the 2007 BWF World Championships in men's doubles with Albertus Susanto Njoto. They were seeded #12 Yohan Hadikusumo Wiratama is the current world record holder for the most head shots in a badminton game. his record is 15 head shots in one single game. In 2017, Wiratama who was 40 years old, plays for Australia and won the men's doubles title at the Sydney International tournament with Albertus Susanto Njoto.

Achievements

East Asian Games 
Mixed doubles

BWF Grand Prix (3 titles, 5 runners-up) 
The BWF Grand Prix had two levels, the BWF Grand Prix and Grand Prix Gold. It was a series of badminton tournaments sanctioned by the Badminton World Federation (BWF) which was held from 2007 to 2017. The World Badminton Grand Prix sanctioned by International Badminton Federation (IBF) from 1983 to 2006.

Men's doubles

Mixed doubles

  BWF Grand Prix Gold tournament
  BWF Grand Prix tournament

BWF International Challenge/Series/Satellite (2 titles, 4 runners-up) 
Men's singles

Men's doubles

Mixed doubles

  BWF International Challenge tournament
  BWF International Series/ Satellite tournament

References

External links 
 BWF Player Profile

1977 births
Living people
Indonesian people of Chinese descent
Indonesian male badminton players
Competitors at the 1999 Southeast Asian Games
Southeast Asian Games gold medalists for Indonesia
Southeast Asian Games medalists in badminton
Hong Kong people of Indonesian descent
Hong Kong male badminton players
Badminton players at the 2006 Asian Games
Badminton players at the 2010 Asian Games
Asian Games competitors for Hong Kong
Australian people of Indonesian descent
Australian male badminton players